Kabale–Kisoro–Bunagana Road is a road in Western Uganda, connecting the towns of Kabale with the towns of Kisoro, Bunagana, at the border with the Democratic Republic of the Congo and Kyanika at the border with Rwanda.

Location

There is a  loop around the southern part of Kisoro Airport, added for safety concerns. Also at Kisoro, a  spur of the road connects to Kyanika, at the border with Rwanda. The road connects the countries of DRCongo, Uganda and Rwanda. The coordinates of the road near Kisoro are:1°16'58.0"S, 29°42'05.0"E (Latitude:-1.282778; Longitude:29.701389).

Upgrading to bitumen
The government of Uganda earmarked this road for upgrading through the conversion of the existing gravel road to bitumen surface and the building of bridges and drainage channels. The construction contract with SBI International Holdings AG of Switzerland was signed in 2007. The contract price was USh: 195,445,535,968/- (approx. US$107 million at that time). 89.5 per cent of the cost was loaned to Uganda by the African Development Bank, while the Ugandan government funded the remaining 10.5 percent. The road improvements were completed in 2012.

See also
 Kisoro District
 Kabale District
 Economy of Uganda
 UNRA
 List of roads in Uganda

References

External links
 Uganda National Road Authority Homepage

Roads in Uganda
Kisoro District
Kabale District
Western Region, Uganda